Magic Cellphone is a 2016 South Korean web series that aired online from Jul 13, 2016 to Sep 14, 2016. The SBS drama is a Korean-Chinese joint venture of the production company Aura Media. It aired weekly on Sohu TV.

Plot 
The drama revolves around the romance between a man named Oh Tae-ji (Kim Jin-woo), who works at a makeup store, and his first love Lee Ji-hee, who is also known as Latte (Park Min-ji), a new actress who is the subject of attention. They finally meet again when Latte has a fan-sign event at the makeup store where Tae-ji is working at. Later on, Tae-ji will be given a magic cellphone from a mysterious old lady that can be used to protect the person he loves, which is Latte, in the midst of a crisis and he's set on saving her.

Cast 
 Kim Jin-woo as Oh Tae-ji
 Jung Jae-hyuk as young Tae-ji
 Park Min-ji as Lee Ji-hee (Latte)
 Song Ji-ah as young Ji-hee
 Nam Jung-hee as Ji-hee's grandmother
 Kwak In-joon as Ma Dong-sik
 Kim Mi-so as Chief Jo
 Kim Ki-doo as Kim Ho-chang
 Kang Dong-hwa as Joo-ok
 Kim Sung-gi as Lee Tae-sun
 Moon Soo-ah as Mi-mi
 Han Ji-soo as Rogue Customer 1
 Do-hae as Rogue Customer 2
 Shin Ye-rin as Rogue Customer 3
 Lee Chan-ho as Reporter

References 

2016 South Korean television series debuts
South Korean romantic comedy television series
South Korean fantasy television series
Works about mobile phones